Pierre Lelong  (14 March 1912 Paris – 12 October 2011) was a French mathematician who introduced the Poincaré–Lelong equation, the Lelong number and the concept of plurisubharmonic functions.

Career
Lelong earned his doctorate in 1941 from the École Normale Supérieure, under the supervision of Paul Montel. On 5 June 1981 Lelong received an honorary doctorate from the Faculty of 
Mathematics and Science at Uppsala University, Sweden.
He became a member of the French Academy of Sciences in 1985.

Personal life
He married another mathematician, Jacqueline Ferrand, in 1947; they separated in 1977.

References

École Normale Supérieure alumni
20th-century French mathematicians
21st-century French mathematicians
Members of the French Academy of Sciences
Complex analysts
Mathematical analysts
2011 deaths
1912 births